According to medieval and modern sources, a number of Byzantine emperors were allegedly Armenian or of partially Armenian heritage. The following list includes the Byzantine emperors to whom sources attribute Armenian origin. Speculation of Armenian ancestry in emperors remains a wide topic of debate.

History and criticism
The first work on Byzantine emperors of Armenian origin, Armenian Emperors of Byzantium, was authored by Fr. Garabed Der-Sahagian and published in 1905 by the Mekhitarist congregation of San Lazzaro degli Armeni in Venice. Anthony Kaldellis suggested that Der-Sahagian extended "western European modes of racial and nationalist historiography to the history of medieval Armenia." Kaldellis believes that it was Nicholas Adontz who "made the search for Armenians in Byzantium into a more scholarly and less romantic nationalist process." However, he is critical of Adontz as he saw "Armenians everywhere and injected them into as many important events as he could." According to Kaldellis it was later endorsed by Peter Charanis and Alexander Kazhdan and "has spread widely in the field of Byzantine Studies." Kazhdan's book Armenians in the Ruling Class of the Byzantine Empire in the 11th-12th Centuries was published by the Armenian Academy of Sciences in Russian in 1975.

Charanis suggested that "every emperor who sat on the Byzantine throne from the accession of Basil I to the death of Basil II (867—1025) was of Armenian or partially Armenian origin." However, he noted that "in Byzantium the ethnic origins of a person was of not significance, provided he integrated himself into its cultural life." Robert H. Hewsen counted "no fewer than sixteen emperors and eleven empresses" of Byzantium of Armenian origin and suggested that Armenians ruled "for almost a third of [the empire's] history." He conceded, however, that "[m]ost of these Armenians, of course, were thoroughly hellenized, membership in the Greek Church being the sine qua non for advancement in the Byzantine world."

It has been challenged recently by some scholars. Armen Ayvazyan argued that "much of [the] ethnically Armenian elite in the Byzantine Empire, in religious and cultural terms, was almost entirely Hellenized [i.e., Romanized] and certainly put imperial interests above the interests of Armenia, while retaining its connection with the Armenian nation only nominally." Anthony Kaldellis is highly critical of what he calls the "Armenian fallacy" in Byzantine studies to which he dedicated a separate chapter (Armenian fallacy) and a sub-chapter specifically about emperors ('Armenian' emperors) in his 2019 book Romanland: Ethnicity and Empire in Byzantium, published by Harvard University Press. He wrote:
 Earlier, in 2008, Kaldellis wrote in a publication for Oxford University Press: "It makes as much sense to call the emperors Herakleios or Basileios I 'Armenians' as it does to call president Bill Clinton an 'Englishman' or Barack Obama a 'Kenyan'—even less so, in fact, as the former ethnic attributions are mostly conjectural on our part. There is no evidence that these emperors spoke their supposed 'ancestral languages' or knew much about the customs of their supposed ancestor. Yet since Roman national claims have never been taken seriously, Byzantinists have filled the gap with modern ones." Kaldellis' criticisms of the "Armenian fallacy" have been subsequently supported by other scholars, such as Johannes Preiser-Kapeller, Alexander Beihammer, and Marek Klatý.

List

References
Notes

Citations

Bibliography
 
  

Byzantine Empire
Byzantine emperors
Emperors